Carlingford High School is a comprehensive, co-educational government high school located in Carlingford, Sydney, Australia. The school has approximately 1180 enrollments and has achieved top Higher School Certificate scores.

History
The decision to build a new high school at North Carlingford was made in early 1967. Though the decision was originally not well received by the community, especially parents who lived in close proximity to Cumberland High School and whose children were already being sent by bus to Pennant Hills High School, building of the new school commenced in the Autumn. The contractor, A.V Jennings, was to complete sufficient of the building to enable the school to open on the first school day in 1968.

In October, the first principal, MJ Maiden, met 165 students who were in first form at Pennant Hills High School and who were destined for the new school, known officially at this stage as "Carlingford North High School". The students were dressed in school uniform designed by a committee of parents appointed by R. Stacey, principal of Pennant Hills High School. A further meeting was held with the parents where a motion was carried that the Department of Education be asked to name the school "Carlingford High School".

Two more meetings were held with the committee prior to the beginning of the new school year. At these meetings, finalized arrangements for the first school day of 1968 were made, along with the establishment of a school badge and motto. Much thought went into the latter with a view to linking the badge with the name "Carlingford". From H. Faters, former headmaster of Carlingford Rural School, informed the committee that Carlingford was named after Carlingford in Ireland. Maiden, wrote to the Embassy of Ireland in Canberra and received information about Irish Carlingford. It was then decided to design a badge and motto that would incorporate the "Venturegameness" of the Vikings and the idea that education should be an adventure. The design of the badge would be in keeping with the design of the school and with an Australian flavour, hence the square, severe line of the badge and the boomerang on which the motto appears. Several different designs were worked on by artists at "Perfection Plate" and indeed the Maiden family also worked on the design. After a quite argumentative meeting the committee finally reached a decision with the agreed motto "Adventure in Learning" put forward by the appointed deputy principal Mr. N. Leeder and the badge design created by Maiden's wife.

Carlingford High was the first NSW school to have a student council rather than prefects, an innovation of Maiden. As late as the Thursday before school was to resume it was by no means certain that the school would be open due to inclement weather, and the light flooding of B block. Although the weather cleared and concrete was poured on the Friday, And because of an unseasonably warm weekend, the school was able to be officially opened on Tuesday 31 January 1968.

This school is currently located on North Rocks Road between two primary schools, Roselea Public School and St Gerard's Primary Catholic School, near the Plympton Rd

Music
The school has many music ensembles.  Two Concert bands, two Stage bands, two Choirs and one String ensemble. They also produce a musical biannually. They have achieved many successful shows over the past years and have performed around Australia.

The schools 2020 Adams Family musical was postponed to 2021 due to the COVID-19 pandemic and the 2020 Schools Spectacular has been cancelled as well. The production of the Adams family was replaced by the play clue based on the game cluedo

Notable alumni 
 Amanda Keller (OAM) Gold Logie nominee, journalist, radio presenter, and media personality
 Sally McManusSecretary of the ACTU
 Tim BruneroBig Brother contestant
 Victor Mishalowmusician, musicologist
 Stephen O'Dohertyjournalist, former politician
 Timmy Trumpetmusician, DJ

Notable former staff 
 Peter Crawfordformer politician; former Member for Balmain

References

External links
Official website

Public high schools in Sydney
1968 establishments in Australia
Educational institutions established in 1968